Hydantoic acid is an acid with the chemical formula C3H6N2O3.  Its molecule contains a total of 13 bonds including seven non-H bonds, two multiple bonds, two rotatable bonds, two double bonds, one carboxylic acid (aliphatic), one urea derivative, and one hydroxyl group.  It can be obtained from uric acid as well as from glycine with urea in the presence of alkali.

References

Carboxylic acids
Ureas